Dr. Athar Ali (20 August 1963 – 4 October 2003) was a Pakistani system engineer and a rocket scientist who was murdered in Karachi on 4 October 2003. He was an expert in missile technology and was the senior scientist at the Space and Upper Atmosphere Research Commission (SUPARCO) during the time of the development of Shaheen missile guidance system. SUPARCO is a Pakistani governmental agency.  His death led to the mass demonstration in a Shiite community in Karachi.

Education
A graduate of NED University of Engineering and Technology, Ali received his doctorate (PhD) in system engineering from the same institute. His doctoral studies were funded by the SUPARCO in the 1980s. He associated with SUPARCO during his master's studies in system engineering. He played an important and central role in the Pakistani space program.

SUPARCO career
Having joined SUPARCO in 1985, Ali was associated with the rocket's electrical and electronics system. Thereafter, he specialised in missile technology while the Hatf missile system was being developing. At the SUPARCO, Ali was one of the senior scientists involved in the indigenous development of the Shaheen guidended missile systems, and was responsible for the program's electrical and system power engineering at the SUPARCO. In 2002, due to his contribution to the agency, he was promoted as the deputy-director of the commission.

Assassination and culprits

In the afternoon of 4 October 2003, Ali along with 35 members of SUPARCO were on the way to SUPARCO Headquarters. At the 12:45 pm, the SUPARCO bus dropped some people at a nearby mosque and then proceeded towards an Imambargah near the Baba Wilayat Shah shrine to drop the remaining persons to the designated check post. As the bus reached the junction of a link road and the Hub river road, three unidentified armed men on a motorcycle intercepted the bus and opened fire.

This drive-by-shooting lasting just a few minutes, left five dead and eight others wounded including officials of the Pakistan Army who were on guard duty at the facility. The bodies of the victims were taken to the Murshid Hospital where they were pronounced as dead. Later, the dead bodies were shifted the bodies to the Rizvia Imambargah.

Investigation
The Karachi city authorities termed the incident a sectarian killing and the team of special agents of FIA had been initiated. The Law enforcement agencies and the Karachi Police refused to speculate as to whether the killings were motivated by any particular incident. However, the police suspected the banned Lashkar-i-Jhangvi behind the killings.

According to the online news of Pakistan, the Indian external agency, Research and Analysis Wing (RAW) has been behind the attacks. The source also concluded that RAW hired activists of Quetta-based Balochistan Liberation Army (BLA) outlawed outfit for this incidence of terrorism and real target was Athar Ali who was, in the past, was targeted twice but he was able to manage an escape from the scene. The following day of the killings, the FIA had arrested the RAW agent and few other members of BLA. However, Indian Government has denied the allegations and its agency's involvement in the assassinations.

Aftermath

Athar Ali's death brought mass demonstration in the shiite community in Pakistan. The shiite religious parties condemned the death of Dr. Ali, and accused the Government of Pakistan in the death. The non-profit organisation, Imamia Students Organisation (ISO), Anjuman Tahaffuz Azadari (ATA), and Tehrik-i-Islami (TI) activists on Saturday staged a demonstration to condemn the killings in Karachi. After the mass demonstration in Karachi, the FIA's special agents arrested the culprits and masterminds of the killings. All of the members were closely associated with the Sipah-e-Sahab and Lashkar-e-Jhangvi. The associated members were hanged and executed by the Government of Pakistan.

Legacy

Dr. Athar Ali was a noted scientist and missile technologist who had contributed in the nation's space program. As a missile expert, he had a rich contribution in the field of rocket science. His assassination brought a nationwide protests and demonstrations. Following his death, Dr. Ali was awarded Hilal-i-Imtiaz by the President of Pakistan. After his death, the Pakistani government learned a valuable lesson and has increased the security of its scientists and engineers who closely were working in the country's confidential programs.

References

Further references
 

Pakistani Shia Muslims
Pakistani physicists
People murdered in Karachi
1963 births
2003 deaths
20th-century Pakistani engineers
Assassinated Pakistani people
Terrorism deaths in Pakistan
Space and Upper Atmosphere Research Commission people
Assassinated educators
NED University of Engineering & Technology alumni
Deaths by firearm in Sindh